Colonel John David Dungs (Rtd) (3 February 1952 – 2 May 2014) served as Military Administrator of Delta State from August 1996 until August 1998 during the military regime of General Sani Abacha.
He had also served as acting Military Administrator of Oyo State from 1994 to 1996.

In August 1990, Lieutenant Colonel Dungs was a member of the multinational force in Liberia when a gunboat was seized, capturing 27 rebels.

Dungs was a candidate to become the People's Democratic Party candidate in the 2007 governorship elections for Plateau State.

In 2012, He also ran unsuccessfully for the seat of Plateau North senatorial district  which was left vacant on the demise of Senator Gyang Dalyop Datong on the platform of the Democratic People's Party losing to Senator Gyang Pwajok of the Peoples' Democratic Party.

In April 2009, Dungs was an unsuccessful contender to become traditional ruler of the Berom people (Gbong Gwom Jos) in Jos.

Besides his military background and political affiliations, John Dungs can be famously remembered as a prominent captain of industry being the founder and chief executive of Langfield Group Limited an industrial conglomerate with diversified interests in various sectors of the economy. He was instrumental to the creation of Riyom and Jos-East Local Government Areas of Plateau State.

Dungs died on 2 May 2014 en route to a hospital after collapsing at his residence in Rayfield, Jos. His death came within the week following the death of his father, Da. Dung Jok, the Gwom Rwei (district head) of Riyom after a protracted illness.

References

Nigerian military governors of Delta State
Nigerian Army officers
1952 births
2014 deaths